These are the Billboard magazine R&B albums that have reached number one on the chart in 1987.

Chart history

See also
1987 in music
R&B number-one hits of 1987 (USA)

1987